Cabares is a Neotropical genus of butterflies in the family Hesperiidae (Eudaminae).

Species
Cabares potrillo (Lucas, 1857)
C. p. potrillo  South Texas to Costa Rica, Greater Antilles, Central America
C. p. reducta Mabille & Boullet, 1919 Venezuela
Cabares rinta Evans, 1952 Argentina

References

Natural History Museum Lepidoptera genus database

External links
Images representing Cabares  at Consortium for the Barcode of Life

Hesperiidae
Hesperiidae genera
Taxa named by Frederick DuCane Godman
Taxa named by Osbert Salvin